J. R. Havlan is a former writer for The Daily Show, where he won eight Emmys for Writing for a Variety, Music or Comedy Program.
Before his writing career, he was a stand-up comic who appeared on The Late Show with David Letterman and Late Night with Conan O'Brien, not to mention numerous other TV shows not nearly as cool as those first two. Before writing for The Daily Show, Havlan did the crowd warm-up for Politically Incorrect where he also wrote for the show's monologue.
J.R. was also a writer for The New York Times best-selling books "America: The Book", "Earth: The Book", and the 2006 and 2008 Academy Awards.
Most recently, J.R. created and hosts his own podcast called Writers' Bloc, on which he interviews other television and film comedy writers about their backgrounds, beginnings and influences with a focus on the process of writing comedy.
Since leaving The Daily Show in 2014, J.R. has written for The Tonight Show with Jimmy Fallon, and was the head writer for "Black and White", a weekly comedy series on A&E that he helped develop along with many other projects for various networks and production companies.
He graduated from Cal State East Bay (formerly Cal State University, Hayward) where he majored in something he currently has little if any use for.

J.R. Has a wife and 2 kids who, in turn, have a husband and a father.

References

American stand-up comedians
American television writers
Living people
Year of birth missing (living people)